Two ships of the Royal Navy have borne the name HMS Offa, after Offa of Mercia. A third was renamed before being launched:

  was an  launched in 1916 and sold in 1921.
  was an O-class destroyer launched in 1941. She was sold to the Pakistani Navy in 1949 and renamed Tariq. She was scrapped in 1959.

Royal Navy ship names